Jonathan Scott-Taylor (born 6 March 1962) is an English actor.

Early life
He was born in São Paulo, Brazil to English parents; his father was a consultant for the fishery industry in Brazil at the time. He was educated at Haberdashers' Aske's Boys' School. Scott-Taylor started going to drama school at age 11.

Acting career
He played the character of Jim Hawkins in a stage musical of Treasure Island in 1973. He went on to take minor roles in Bugsy Malone (1976) and The Four Feathers (1978), and a starring role in a BBC production of The Winslow Boy (1977) after which he was chosen to play teen Damien Thorn in Damien: Omen II (1978).

In 1979, he played the role of Lucius, Brutus' servant, in a BBC production of Shakespeare's The Tragedy of Julius Caesar.

Following Omen II, he had a few more roles in Tales of the Unexpected as sadistic prep school bully Bruce "Galloping" Foxley in the episode "Galloping Foxley", as Tom Tulliver in The Mill on the Floss, the 1980s BBC soap opera Triangle, the 1985 film Shadey, and the TV series Troubles, but has not performed since 1988.

Filmography

Film

Television

References

External links
 

1962 births
English male child actors
English male film actors
English male stage actors
Living people
People from São Paulo